The Bangladesh National Chess Championship is the annual individual national chess championship of Bangladesh.

National Champions

Winners of championships by year
{| class="sortable wikitable"
! Year !! Open Champion !! Women's Champion
|-
|	1974	||	Miah Abdus Salek	||	Not held	        	
|-
|	1975	||	Mirza Akmal Hossain	||	Not held	        	
|-
|	1976	||	Mirza Akmal Hossain	||	Not held	        	
|-
|	1977	||	Not held	||	Not held	        	
|-
|	1978	||	Rezaul Haque	||	Not held	        	
|-
|	1979	||	Niaz Murshed	||	Rani Hamid
|-
|	1980	||	Niaz Murshed	||	Rani Hamid
|-
|	1981	||	Niaz Murshed	||	Rani Hamid
|-
|	1982	||	Niaz Murshed	||	Rani Hamid
|-
|	1983	||	Jamilur Rahman	||	Rani Hamid
|-
|	1984	||	Younus Hasan	||	Rani Hamid
|-
|	1985	||	Sayed Ahmed Sohel	||	Yesmin Begum
|-
|	1986	||	Zillur Rahman  Champak	||	Yesmin Begum
|-
|	1987	||	Zillur Rahman  Champak	||	Not held
|-
|	1988	||	Ziaur Rahman	||	Rani Hamid
|-
|	1989	||	Rezaul Haque	||	Syeda Shabana Parveen Nipa
|-
|	1990	||	Syed Tahmidur Rahman	||	Rani Hamid
|-
|	1991	||	Reefat Bin-Sattar	||	Tanima Parveen
|-
|	1992	||	Reefat Bin-Sattar	||	Rani Hamid
|-
|	1993	||	Reefat Bin-Sattar	||	Zakia Sultana
|-
|	1994	||	Ziaur Rahman	||	Tanima Parveen
|-
|	1995	||	Reefat Bin-Sattar	||	Syeda Shabana Parveen Nipa
|-
|	1996	||	Ziaur Rahman	||	Rani Hamid
|-
|	1997	||	Enamul Hossain	||	Syeda Shabana Parveen Nipa
|-
|	1998	||	Ziaur Rahman	||	Rani Hamid
|-
|	1999	||	Ziaur Rahman	||	Rani Hamid
|-
|	2000	||	Reefat Bin-Sattar	||	Nazrana Khan Eva
|-
|	2001	||	Ziaur Rahman	||	Rani Hamid
|-
|	2002	||	Ziaur Rahman	||	Syeda Shabana Parveen Nipa
|-
|	2003	||	Reefat Bin-Sattar	||	Syeda Shabana Parveen Nipa
|-
|	2004	||	Ziaur Rahman	||	Rani Hamid
|-
|	2005	||	Ziaur Rahman	||	Shamima Akter Liza
|-
|	2006	||	Enamul Hossain	||	Rani Hamid
|-
|	2007	||	Abdullah Al Rakib	||	Rani Hamid
|-
|	2008	||	Ziaur Rahman	||	Rani Hamid
|-
|	2009	||	Ziaur Rahman	||	Sharmin Shirin Sultana
|-
|	2010	||	Minhaz Uddin Ahmed	||	Shamima Akter Liza
|-
|	2011	||	Ziaur Rahman	||	Rani Hamid
|-
|	2012	||	Niaz Murshed	||	Sharmin Shirin Sultana
|-
|	2013	||	Abdullah Al Rakib	||	Not held
|-
|	2014	||	Ziaur Rahman	||	Shamima Akter Liza
|-
|	2015	||	Minhaz Uddin Ahmed	||	Shamima Akter Liza
|-
|	2016	||	Enamul Hossain	||	Nazrana Khan Eva
|-
|	2017	||		||Sharmin Shirin Sultana
|-
|	2018	||	Ziaur Rahman	||Rani Hamid

|}

Number of championship titles (Open)

Number of championship titles (Women's)

International Titles

Open titles

GM
Total : 5

Niaz Murshed
Ziaur Rahman
Reefat Bin-Sattar
Abdullah Al Rakib
Enamul Hossain

IM
Total : 3

 Zillur Rahman  Champak
 Abu Sufian Shakil
 Minhaz Uddin Ahmed

FM
Total : 14

 Rezaul Haque
 Jamilur Rahman
 Syed Tahmidur Rahman
 Younus Hasan
 Khandekar Aminul Islam
 Sheikh Nasir Ahmed
 Taibur Rahman Sumon
 Syed Mahfuzur Rahman Emon
 Mehedi Hasan Parag
 Md. Abdul Malek
 Mohammad Jabed Mostafa
 Debaraj Chatterjee
 Fahad Rahman
 Saif Uddin Lavlu

CM
Total : 4

 Ikramul Haq Siam
 Sohel Chowdhury
 Mahtabuddin Ahmed
 Monir Hossain

Women's titles

WIM
Total : 2

 Rani Hamid
 Shamima Akter Liza

WFM
Total : 6

 Syeda Shabana Parveen Nipa
 Afroza Khanam Babli
 Tanima Parveen
 Zakia Sultana
 Nazrana Khan Eva
 Sharmin Shirin Sultana

WCM
Total : 1

 Mahmuda Hoque Chowdhury

References
 List of men's champions and details: 
 List of women's champions and details: 

Chess national championships
Women's chess national championships
Championship
1974 in chess